Finer Moments is a compilation album by Frank Zappa. It was compiled and mastered by Zappa in 1972 and released posthumously in 2012.

Overview
Some of the tracks from this album have appeared (most of them under another title) on various other releases including 1991's You Can't Do That on Stage Anymore, Vol. 4, 1992's You Can't Do That on Stage Anymore, Vol. 5, 1998's Mystery Disc, 1996's The Lost Episodes, and 2011's Carnegie Hall.

Track listing

Personnel
Musicians

 Frank Zappa – guitar, vocals
 Don Preston – keyboards, mini moog
 Ian Underwood – clarinet, keyboards, piano, alto sax, woodwind
 Bunk Gardner – tenor sax, woodwind
 Motorhead Sherwood – baritone sax
 Buzz Gardner – trumpet
 Roy Estrada – bass, vocals
 Jimmy Carl Black – drums
 Art Tripp – drums, percussion
 Lowell George – guitar (on "There Is No Heaven From Where Slogans Go To Die" and "Squeeze It, Squeeze It, Squeeze It")
 Dave Samuels – guest artist, vibraphone (on "There Is No Heaven From Where Slogans Go To Die")

on "The Old Curiosity Shoppe" :

 Frank Zappa – guitar
 Ian Underwood – alto sax
 Bob Harris – keyboards
 Jim Pons – bass
 Aynsley Dunbar – drums
 Howard Kaylan – cowbell, tambourine
 Mark Volman – cowbell, tambourine

on "The Subcutaneous Peril" :

 Frank Zappa – guitar
 Don Preston – keyboards, mini moog
 Ian Underwood – keyboards
 Jim Pons – bass
 Aynsley Dunbar – drums

Production credits
 Ed Caraeff – photography
 Jerry Hansen – engineer
 Dick Kunc – engineer
 Stephen Marcussen – mastering
 Kerry McNabb – engineer
 Michael Mesker – layout, photography
 Bill Miller – cover art, liner notes
 Melanie Starks – production manager
 Joe Travers – transfers
 John Williams – photography

Overlaps with other albums 
 Burnt Weeny Sandwich
 "Enigmas 1 Thru 5" contains parts from "Theme From Burnt Weeny Sandwich" in a sped-up version
 The Ark from Beat the Boots
 "Uncle Rhebus" contains a shorter edit of "Uncle Meat/King Kong" (only the secondary theme of "King Kong")
 You Can't Do That on Stage Anymore, Vol. 4
 "There Is No Heaven From Where Slogans Go To Die" is a slightly longer version of "You Call That Music?" 
 You Can't Do That on Stage Anymore, Vol. 5
 "Mozart Piano Sonata In B♭" is a different edit 
 "Uncle Rhebus" contains "Baked Bean Boogie" and "Piano/drum duet" 
 The final segment of "Squeeze It, Squeeze It, Squeeze It" (2:54-3:20) is also heard in "Right There" 
 The Lost Episodes
 "The Big Squeeze" is the same version
 Mystery Disc 
 "You Never Know Who Your Friends Are" is a longer version of "Harmonica Fun" 
 "Squeeze It, Squeeze It, Squeeze It" is a different edit of "Skweezit Skweezit Skweezit"
 Carnegie Hall
 "The Subcutaneous Peril" is edited from "Pound For A Brown" and "King Kong"

Notes and references

External links 
 Official page for the album on the Zappa website
 For indepth description of the album and its material

Compilation albums published posthumously
Frank Zappa compilation albums
2012 compilation albums
Zappa Records albums